The men's 5000 metres at the 2010 African Championships in Athletics were held on August 1.

Results

External links
Results

5000
5000 metres at the African Championships in Athletics